Saifullah "Sam" Zaman (17 April 1965 – 19 May 2015), known by the stage name State of Bengal, was a British DJ and music producer of Bangladeshi descent associated with the UK and Asian Underground movement.

Early life
Zaman was born on 17 April 1965 in then East Pakistan.
He lived in Ankara, Amman, and Dhaka before moving to London, England at the age of eight. His parents are of Bangladeshi origin, from the district of Noahkhali. His father is a homeopathic doctor.

Career
In 1987, Zaman set up the State of Bengal group in London after a visit to Noakhali, Bangladesh, where he interacted with traditional folk musicians and dancers. Original members of the group included his youngest brother Deeder Zaman (who later became vocalist of Asian Dub Foundation). Outside of the State of Bengal project, Zaman also worked with British Asian youth groups, setting up music training workshops. After working in a variety of communities from across the country. Sam founded and set up Betelnut Records.

Formerly a teacher, Zaman worked at youth centres. State of Bengal was a DJ at the Anokha club in London's East End during the mid-1990s. His tracks "Flight IC408" and "Chittagong Chill" – written and produced with Matt Mars – were featured on Anokha – Soundz of the Asian Underground compilation, and helped him gain prominence. Singer Björk discovered his work at Anokha, he opened for her on the Homeogenic world tour, and remixed her track "Hunter", also signing to the One Little Indian record label. State of Bengal took up residency at the 333, in Hoxton on the Off Centre club nights, he continued with his DJ and did extensive remix work.

He produced his debut album, Visual Audio in 1998 which also featured Suzana Ansar and followed that up with Walking On, a collaboration with Ananda Shankar in 1999. His next album was also a collaboration, Tana Tani with Paban Das Baul, in 2004 and then in 2007 he released Skip-ji on his own record label.

Alongside his DJ and music work, Zaman continued to teach and deliver music workshops.

Personal life and death
Zaman was the eldest of 5 siblings, with two younger sisters and two brothers. His family called him Arun, which means sun rising.
 
On 19 May 2015 Zaman died in hospital.

On 15 June 2017, the British Plaque Trust honoured Zaman by unveiling a Blue Plaque outside his home and studio in East London, where all his albums were created.

Discography

Singles

Albums

Compilations

Remixes and other work

See also
Asian Underground
British Bangladeshi
List of British Bangladeshis

References

External links

State of Bengal on BritBangla
Betelnut Records website
Ethnotechno interview with State of Bengal
State of Bengal and his views
Iqbal, Jamil. Mr. Sam Zaman. Swadhinata Trust. 28 March 2006

1965 births
2015 deaths
Place of death missing
Pakistani emigrants to the United Kingdom
Naturalised citizens of the United Kingdom
British people of Bangladeshi descent
Club DJs
British record producers
British electronic musicians
Asian Underground musicians
Musicians from Karachi
DJs from London